Ambragaeana is a genus of Asian cicadas in the tribe Gaeanini.  This genus was previously placed in Gaeana and species in this tribe are often called "butterfly cicadas" because of the colours and patterns of their wings.

Species
The Catalogue of Life lists:
 Ambragaeana ambra Chou & Yao, 1985 - type species
 Ambragaeana laosensis (Distant, 1917)
 Ambragaeana stellata (Walker F, 1858)
 Ambragaeana sticta (Chou & Yao, 1985)

References

External links 

Images on Cicada Mania

Cicadas
Gaeanini
Hemiptera of Asia
Cicadidae genera